Freynestown may refer to:

Republic of Ireland
Freynestown, County Kilkenny, a townland in the civil parish of Tiscoffin, County Kilkenny
Freynestown, County Wicklow, a civil parish in County Wicklow